Sourcetrail was a FOSS source code explorer that provided interactive dependency graphs and support for multiple programming languages including C, C++, Java and Python.

History

The project was started by Eberhard Gräther after an internship at Google where he worked on Google Chrome, and noticed that he consumed a lot of time (1 month) to implement a simple feature that he expected to be done in 1–2 hours. This was his motivation to develop a tool that helps in understanding the consequences of source code modifications. The project started as a commercial project in 2016 under the name Coati. In November 2019, Sourcetrail was released as open-source software under version three of the GNU General Public License.

The project was discontinued in 2021.

Concept

Most of a programmer's time is invested in reading the source code. Therefore, Sourcetrail is intended to help the developers to understand the source code and the relationship between different components. Sourcetrail builds a dependency graph after indexing the source code files and provides a graphical overview of the source code.

It is built in an extendable way, so it could be extended to support more programming languages.

See also
 Software visualization

References

External links
 

Visualization software
Static program analysis tools
Software metrics
Infographics
Software maintenance
Software development
Software quality
Source code
Discontinued software